The 2003 Pitch and putt European Championship held in McDonagh (Ireland) was promoted by the European Pitch and Putt Association (EPPA), with 8 national teams in competition.

Ireland won their third European Pitch and putt Championship.

Qualifying round

Final round

Final standings

External links
European Pitch and Putt Championship 

Pitch and putt competitions